The 2018/19 FIS Freestyle Ski World Cup was the fortieth World Cup season in freestyle skiing organised by International Ski Federation. The season started on 7 September 2018 and ended on 30 March 2019. This season included six disciplines: moguls, aerials, ski cross, halfpipe, slopestyle and big air.

Men

Ski Cross

Moguls

Dual Moguls

Aerials

Halfpipe

Big Air

Slopestyle

Ladies

Ski Cross

Moguls

Dual Moguls

Aerials

Halfpipe

Big Air

Slopestyle

Team

Team Aerials

Men's standings

Overall

Ski Cross

Cross Alps Tour

Moguls

Aerials

Halfpipe

Big Air

Slopestyle

Ladies' standings

Overall

Ski Cross

Cross Alps Tour

Moguls

Aerials

Halfpipe

Big Air

Slopestyle

Nations Cup

Overall

References

FIS Freestyle Skiing World Cup
World Cup
World Cup